Roberts-Justice House is a historic home located at Kernersville, Forsyth County, North Carolina.  It was built in 1877, and is a two-story, "L"-shaped Italianate style brick dwelling. It has a one-story rear kitchen ell.  It was remodeled in 1916 in the Colonial Revival style.

It was listed on the National Register of Historic Places in 1988.

References

Houses on the National Register of Historic Places in North Carolina
Italianate architecture in North Carolina
Colonial Revival architecture in North Carolina
Houses completed in 1877
Houses in Forsyth County, North Carolina
National Register of Historic Places in Forsyth County, North Carolina
1877 establishments in North Carolina